{{DISPLAYTITLE:C20H24N2O5}}
The molecular formula C20H24N2O5 (molar mass: 372.41 g/mol, exact mass: 372.1685 u) may refer to:

 Codoxime
 Medroxalol

Molecular formulas